Nombre de Dios (Spanish, "Name of God") may refer to:
 Nombre de Dios, Colón, town in Panama
Nombre de Dios, Durango, city in Mexico
Nombre de Dios Municipality, municipality in Mexico whose seat is Nombre de Dios
Nombre de Dios (mission), mission in Florida
Nombre de Dios River, river in Panama
Nombre de Dios Grottoes, cave in Mexico
Cordillera Nombre de Dios, mountain range and natural preserve, Atlantida, Honduras